Charles A Munn III (born in Baltimore, Maryland on 3 December 1954) is an American conservation biologist and ecotourism entrepreneur. Munn is the founder and owner of SouthWild, a conservation-based ecotourism company that offers high-end photo safaris throughout South America. In 2013, Condé Nast Traveller chose him as one of worlds's three leading experts on wildlife tourism, and the only one for South America. From 1984-2000 he was a conservation field biologist with the Wildlife Conservation Society. He also founded Peru Verde Conservation Group, the BioBrasil Foundation, and Tropical Nature Conservation Group.  Munn is an American citizen but spends most of his time in Brazil and Chile.
He is based in the Mato Grosso state.

Family
His paternal grandfather, Charles A. Munn was the owner of the American Totalizator Company and his paternal grandmother was Mary Astor Paul, one of many heirs to the Drexel banking fortune of Philadelphia, Pennsylvania.  Munn's father, Charles A. Munn, Jr., died in 1957 of ALS at the age of 42. Charles Munn III's only sister was killed in an accident in 1952, before he was born. Munn married Martha Brecht in 1982; the couple was separated in 1990 and later divorced in 1992. Munn is currently separated from his second wife, conservation biologist Mariana Valqui.

Academics
After graduating summa cum laude from Princeton with a bachelor’s in biology in 1977, Munn went on to earn a master's degree in zoology at Oxford in 1979, then a PhD in evolutionary biology back at Princeton in 1984. Munn has authored a number of publications on his work in the Amazon.

Selected publications
Munn, C.A, and Terborgh, J. (1979) Multi-species territoriality in neo-tropical foraging flocks, Condor, 81, 338-347.
Munn, C.A, (1985) Permanent canopy and understory flocks in Amazonia: species composition and population density, in P.A., Buckley, E.S. Morton, R.S. Ridgely and F.G. Buckely (eds.) Neotropical Ornithology, AOU Ornithological Monographs, 36, pp. 683–712.
Munn, C.A, (1986) Birds that cry ‘wolf’, Nature, 319, pp. 143–145.
Munn, C.A, J.B Thomsen,  and C. Yamashita. (1987) Population survey and status of the hyacinth macaw (Andorynchus hyacinthinus) in Brazil, Bolivia, and Paraguay.  Report to the secretariat of the convention on international trade in endangered species of wild fauna and flora. Lausanne, Switzerland.
Terborgh J, Robinson S.K, Parker T.A, Munn C.A, (1990) Structure and organization of an Amazonia forest bird community, Ecological Monographs, 60:2, pp. 213–238.
Munn, C.A, (1990) Tropical canopy netting and shooting lines over tall trees, Journal of Field Ornithology, 62:4, pp. 454–463.
Oneil, J.P, Munn C.A, J. Franke, Irma, (1991) Nannopsittaca dachilleae, a new species of parrotlet from eastern Peru, The Auk, Vol. 81:2, pp. 225–229.
Gilardi J.D., Duffy S.S., Munn C.A., Tell L.A. (1999) Biochemical functions of geophagy in parrots: detoxification of dietary toxins and cytoprotective effects. J Chem Ecol, 25, pp. 897–922.

Hyacinth macaws
From 1984 until 2000, Munn was employed as a field scientist for the New York Zoological Society, researching wildlife in the Amazon of Peru, Bolivia, and Brazil.  In 1987, Munn became the director of the Brazilian government’s field survey of the hyacinth macaw, an endangered parrot species vulnerable to poaching from the exotic pet trade. The survey was also supported by Wildlife Conservation International, New York Zoological Society, and World Wildlife Fund.

In the field survey, Munn and his team were charged with exploring the Mato Grosso state of Brazil where hyacinth macaws were most heavily poached to speak to local families, business owners, and conservation officials about the future of the species. They found that the vast majority of locals were unhappy with the rapid decline of the species as a result of poaching, and that many had already resolved to not allow bird catchers on their land any longer.  Perhaps surprisingly, Brazil's largest mining company, Companiha Vale de Rio Doce, was also very helpful in arranging the protection of the macaws. They found that although the locals were extremely receptive to environmental awareness and conservation, hundreds of birds were still being trapped and traded every year.  Munn’s report made the recommendation for the Brazilian government to completely ban trade of the hyacinth macaw, warning that the species was likely to become extinct if action was not taken.  Furthermore, Munn and his colleagues published a letter for the Secretariat of the Convention International Trade in Endangered Species (CITES) of wild fauna and flora (See notable publications) in 1987, which led directly to the global trade ban of hyacinth macaws.
Munn continues to remain invested in the future of hyacinth macaws.  He even operates a lodge which protects a nesting population of hyacinths in the Brazilian Pantanal.

Indigenous communities
Munn and his organization recognize the extreme difficulty that poverty presents as a road block to conservation. By instituting ecotourism networks which directly benefit ecotourism communities, it is possible to create a more sustainable economy for disenfranchised communities.  Munn has worked to benefit these indigenous communities in both his past and current ventures.

For example, while researching the biology of the scarlet macaw in the eastern amazon, he was made aware of the constant onslaught that the species was subjected to as a result of the illegal pet trade. It became clear that there was a large chance that their wilderness home would be quickly over-poached and the species would suffer. Munn helped locals set up tours of clay licks near Peru's Manu National Park, where scarlet macaws gather by the hundreds to eat clay in order to detoxify the palm nuts they feed on.

Not coincidentally, Munn spent much of his career studying macaw clay licks, the locations of which were unknown to science before his interactions with locals. Macaws gather in the hundreds at these locations.  Knowing this Munn was able to set up tours operated by the indigenous communities that led tourists to see these spectacular birds. Munn knew from experience that most tourists go to the jungle expecting to see vibrant and charismatic animals like the macaw easily, but more often than not they leave disappointed. Munn acts as a champion of South American wildlife tourism, insisting that it can be just as successful as the African ecotourism network. The animals are just as charismatic, you just have to know where to look.

The communities in Manu continue to benefit from a sustainable and expanding ecotourism network.  Better still, the thriving tourism provides a continuous reason to protect Manu and the macaws that make their home there.

Land protected
Between 1980 and 2000, Munn was essential in the creation and increased protection of millions of acres of reserves and national parks in the Peruvian, Bolivian, and Ecuadorian Amazon

Tambopata National Reserve, Peru - The Tambopata Reserve encompasses a vast area in southeastern Peru including the Candamo River Watershed.  Munn spearheaded a group of biologists and naturalists in the 1980s (working with Selva Sur and the Wildlife Conservation Society) that explored the Peruvian Amazon and cataloged its immense biodiversity and pristine, uninhabited rainforest. They drafted several arguments that urged the government to protect the extremely ecologically valuable area, showing that the area held an unprecedented amount of forest unspoiled by hunting and logging.  Munn worked tirelessly for years against the extraction interests, urging the government to protect the park. He made many enemies as a result, including a corrupt forest minister, and even had to flee Peru at one point as a result of death threats.  Finally, Tambopata National Reserve (Reserva Nacional Tambopata) was officially declared a park by supreme law in 1990, constituting over 275,000 hectares of protected forest. However, ExxonMobil attempted to push into Tambopata at one point, and the president at the time, Alberto Fujimori cut the size of the protected area in half as a result.  However, Munn and his litany of conservationists, including Argentinian filmmaker Daniel Winitzky were not going to back down.  Winitzky created the documentary The Last Forest Without Man, which created a storm of public outrage against the proposed oil drilling. President Fujimori responded to public pressure in 2000 and doubled the size of the park to over 1 million hectares.  Ecotourism now flourishes and continues to protect Tambopata thanks to Munn and his colleagues.
Madidi National Park, Bolivia- Munn was also an integral part in the designation of the important Madidi reserve in Bolivia, a park that houses glaciers, pampas, the Andes, cloud forest, and over 1,000 species of birds. While working for the Wildlife Conservation Society in 1992 in Lima, Peru, Munn was hired by the Bolivian government as an international expert on protected areas to oversee the World-Bank financed restructuring of the Bolivian National Parks system.  He was also asked by the government to recommend experts that could aid in the parks creation.  After a long search, he discovered Rosa Maria Ruiz, a Bolivian activist of the non-profit EcoBolivia, that would aid him in scouring the region and interacting with the locals.  The team worked for years to catalog the park's historical, cultural, and ecological value.  Multiple organizations and non-profits also had a hand in its creation, including Conservation International.  Madidi was established a national park in 1995 by President Gonzalo Sanchez de Lozada, thanks to their efforts and encompasses over 1,800,000 hectares.  The park had originally been proposed to protect a mere 50,000 hectares.   Later, they were featured in a National Geographic cover story, "Madidi", by Steve Kemper in which Kemper, Munn, and Rosa Maria Ruiz explored the park to assess possible ecotourism spots and interact with the indigenous Quechua-speaking people.  Being one of the poorest countries in South America, the park held an enormous amount of potential in terms of and bringing jobs and infrastructure to locals.

References

American ecologists
American zoologists
Living people
1954 births